The 51st Pennsylvania Volunteer Infantry was an infantry regiment that served in the Union Army during the American Civil War.

Service
The 51st Pennsylvania Infantry was organized in Harrisburg, Pennsylvania and mustered in November 16, 1861 for a three-year enlistment under the command of Colonel John F. Hartranft.

The regiment was attached to Reno's Brigade, Burnside's North Carolina Expeditionary Corps, to April 1862. 2nd Brigade, 2nd Division, Department of North Carolina, to July 1862. 2nd Brigade, 2nd Division, IX Corps, Army of the Potomac, to April 1863. Army of the Ohio to June 1863. Army of the Tennessee to August 1863, and Army of the Ohio to April 1864. 1st Brigade, 3rd Division, IX Corps, Army of the Potomac, to September 1864. 1st Brigade, 1st Division, IX Corps, to July 1865.

The 51st Pennsylvania Infantry mustered out July 27, 1865.

Detailed service
This regiment was recruited during the summer and fall of 1861 by Col. Hartranft  for three years' service, most of the officers and men having served for the three months' term. Cos. A, C, D, F and I were recruited in Montgomery county; E, H and K in Union and Snyder; G in Centre and B in Northampton.  The place of rendezvous was Camp Curtin, Harrisburg, and the regimental organization was completed on November 16, 1861.  

Two days later it left for Annapolis, Md., where it remained, perfecting itself in drill 
and discipline, until January 6, 1862, when it was assigned to the 2nd brigade (Gen. Reno), Burnside's corps, embarked as a part of Burnside's  expedition to North Carolina, and landed at 
Roanoke island on February 7.  It shared in the capture of the enemy's works here on the 8th and was active at the Battle of New Bern, N.C., in March, where it executed a gallant charge. 
It was again active in the battle of Camden, losing 3 killed and 21 wounded.  

It returned to Fortress Monroe in July and was  assigned to the 2nd brigade, 2nd division, 9th corps, Gen. Ferrero commanding the brigade.  It was active at the second Bull Run and Chantilly, and, in September 1862, moved with the 9th corps on the Maryland campaign.  It skirmished with the enemy's cavalry at Frederick, Md.; was hotly engaged at South mountain and again at Antietam, where its losses were 125, including Lieut. Col. Thomas S. Bell Jr. and Lieuts. Beaver and Hunsicker killed; 
Capts. Bolton and Hart, Adjt. Shorkly, Quartermaster Freedly and Lieut. Lynch wounded.  Maj. Schall was now promoted to lieutenant-colonel, and Capt. Bolton to major.  

The command suffered severely in the fierce fighting at Fredericksburg in December, its losses being 12 killed and 74 wounded.  It was ordered to Fortress Monroe in March 1863, brigaded with the 51st N. Y., 21st Mass., and 11th N. H., and moved thence, with two divisions of the 9th corps, to Kentucky, being posted successively at Winchester, Lancaster, Crab Orchard and 
Stanford.  In June it moved with its corps under command of Gen. Parke to the support of Grant at Vicksburg, arriving on the 14th and going into camp at Mill Dale.  It was employed here and at Oak ridge for several weeks in building fortifications, and joined Sherman in his campaign to Jackson in July.  

The command then returned to Kentucky, encamping at Camp Nelson, where it rested and refitted after its arduous service in Mississippi.  The regiment moved from Camp Nelson to Crab Orchard, where a number of recruits were received, and thence to Knoxville, Tenn.  It was active at the battle of Campbell's station, and suffered all the hardships endured by Burnside's army, when besieged in Knoxville by the enemy under Longstreet.  After the siege was raised it joined in the 
pursuit of the enemy, skirmishing with his rear-guard at Rutledge, and later went into winter quarters at Blaine's cross-roads, where the men suffered much from the meager supplies of food and clothing received.  

On January 5, 1864, the regiment reenlisted for a term of three years and returned to Pennsylvania on 30 days, veteran furlough.  While at home the command was rapidly recruited to the maximum strength, as it was a very popular organization, and on the expiration of its 
furlough it proceeded to Annapolis, where it was assigned to the 1st brigade, 1st division, 9th corps, Col. Hartranft  commanding the brigade and Lieut.-Col. Schall the regiment.  

The 51st participated in all the sanguinary engagements leading up to the siege of Petersburg, losing heavily.  Dating from the battle at the Ny river, May 12, Col. Hartranft was promoted to 
brigadier-general, Lieut.-Col. Schall became colonel, Maj. Bolton lieutenant-colonel, and Capt. Hart major.  In the fierce fighting at Cold Harbor Col. Schall was killed while leading a 
charge and was succeeded in command by Lieut.-Col. Bolton.  The command arrived in front of Petersburg on the 17th and at once engaged the enemy.  It was in action again the next day, 
capturing and holding a position close to the enemy's works. This position was so exposed that a constant fire was kept up, night and day, for more than two weeks, one-third of the men 
being constantly employed to hold the position.  It formed part of the assaulting column at the explosion of the mine, but was ordered back before it entered the crater.  In this advance, 
Col. Bolton was severely wounded and Maj. Hart succeeded to the command.  

The regiment remained on duty in front of the crater for a few days, when it was relieved, and remained encamped in the rear until Aug. 19.  It shared in the movement for the capture of the Weldon railroad, and participated in all the subsequent operations of the brigade, including the engagements at Poplar Spring Church, Ream's station, Hatcher's run, and the final assault on Petersburg, April 2, 1865.  It was mustered out at Alexandria, Va., July 27, 1865, after four years of most trying service.

Casualties
The regiment lost a total of 314 men during service; 12 officers and 165 enlisted men killed or mortally wounded, 137 enlisted men died of disease.

Commanders
 Colonel John F. Hartranft - promoted to brigadier general June 8, 1864
 Colonel William Jordan Bolton

See also

 List of Pennsylvania Civil War Units
 Pennsylvania in the Civil War

References
 Bolton, William J. The Civil War Journal of Colonel William J. Bolton: 51st Pennsylvania, April 20, 1861-August 2, 1865 (Conshohocken, PA: Combined Pub.), 2000. 
 Dyer, Frederick H. A Compendium of the War of the Rebellion (Des Moines, IA:  Dyer Pub. Co.), 1908.
 Gambone, A. M. Major-General John Frederick Hartranft: Citizen Soldier and Pennsylvania Statesman (Baltimore, MD: Butternut and Blue), 1995. 
 Parker, Thomas H. History of the 51st Regiment of P.V. and V.V. (Philadelphia: King & Baird), 1869. [Reprinted in 1998; ]
 Society of the Fifty-First Regiment, Pennsylvania Veteran Volunteers. Record of Proceedings of the First Annual Reunion, Held at Norristown, PA., Sept. 17, 1880'' (Harrisburg, PA: L. S. Hart), 1880.

External links
 Regimental flag of the 51st Pennsylvania Infantry
 51st Pennsylvania Infantry monument at Antietam Battlefield
 Another 51st Pennsylvania Infantry monument at Antietam Battlefield

Military units and formations established in 1861
Military units and formations disestablished in 1865
Units and formations of the Union Army from Pennsylvania